The Crew is an American sitcom television series that aired on Fox from August 31, 1995, to June 30, 1996.

Premise
The show follows the lives of a group of flight attendants working for the fictitious Regency Airlines. Jess Jameson and Maggie Reynolds work together and are roommates in the trendy South Beach section of Miami Beach, Florida. Their other friends include Paul, who is gay; Randy, a southern ladies' man; Lenora, a former flight attendant; MacArthur, the bartender of Mambo Mambo, the restaurant at which the cast socialize; and Captain Rex Parker.

Cast
Rose Jackson as Jess Jameson
Kristin Bauer as Maggie Reynolds
David Burke as Paul Steadman
Charles Esten as Randy Anderson
Dondré Whitfield as MacArthur 'Mac' Edwards
Christine Estabrook as Lenora Zwick, Flight Crew Supervisor 
Lane Davies as Captain Rex Parker

Production history
The series was created by Marc Cherry, Jamie Wooten, John Pardee and Joey Murphy, with Cherry and Wooten as executive producers.  Music production team Wendy Melvoin and Lisa Coleman, aka Wendy & Lisa (formerly of Prince & The Revolution), produced and sang the opening title for the series.

Episodes

External links
 
 

1990s American sitcoms
1995 American television series debuts
1996 American television series endings
Aviation television series
English-language television shows
Fox Broadcasting Company original programming
Television series by 20th Century Fox Television
Television shows set in Miami
Television series about flight attendants
1990s American workplace comedy television series